Beach Haven is a southwestern suburb of the North Shore, located in Auckland, New Zealand. The area has gentrified rapidly over recent years as young professionals moved into the area.

History 

Prior to European settlement, the Beach Haven area was covered to the water’s edge by thick bush, pōhutukawa, ferns and giant kauri trees. Maori tribes inhabited the area, but were decimated by wars and finally succumbed to the newly acquired guns of Hongi Hika. In 1844 the area was sold to the Government and became deserted. One of the first settlers in the district established an orchard near Soldier’s Bay and as the kauri trees were gradually removed from the land, it was found to be an ideal place for fruit growing, especially grapes and strawberries. Most of the kauri trees taken out were used by boat builders for masts and spurs.

The first European settlers arrived in the 1860s and by the 1880s the area was a popular summer resort, with many city dwellers making the trip across the harbour to Island Bay for excursions and holidays.

Up until the 1920s the area was rural, largely made up of market gardens growing fruit (mostly strawberries) and vegetables for the growing city across the harbour. Most of this produce was transported by water. There were also sawmills in the area, the evidence of which could be seen for decades in the form of abandoned machinery and mounds of sawdust. The area was always popular as a holiday destination, evidence of which can still be seen today in some of the remaining baches.

In 1923, the Birkdale Land Company bought and surveyed the land around where the wharf is now and it was then marketed as the Beach Haven Estate, "the Gem of the Waitemata."

After the construction of the Harbour Bridge in 1959, housing subdivisions completed the transformation into an urban area.

Demographics

Beach Haven had a population of 10,566 at the 2018 New Zealand census, an increase of 429 people (4.2%) since the 2013 census, and an increase of 735 people (7.5%) since the 2006 census. There were 3,549 households, comprising 5,217 males and 5,349 females, giving a sex ratio of 0.98 males per female, with 2,337 people (22.1%) aged under 15 years, 2,076 (19.6%) aged 15 to 29, 5,070 (48.0%) aged 30 to 64, and 1,080 (10.2%) aged 65 or older.

Ethnicities were 73.6% European/Pākehā, 14.6% Māori, 11.2% Pacific peoples, 13.7% Asian, and 3.5% other ethnicities. People may identify with more than one ethnicity.

The percentage of people born overseas was 33.1, compared with 27.1% nationally.

Although some people chose not to answer the census's question about religious affiliation, 52.8% had no religion, 34.4% were Christian, 0.8% had Māori religious beliefs, 1.3% were Hindu, 1.2% were Muslim, 1.3% were Buddhist and 2.4% had other religions.

Of those at least 15 years old, 2,463 (29.9%) people had a bachelor's or higher degree, and 969 (11.8%) people had no formal qualifications. 2,016 people (24.5%) earned over $70,000 compared to 17.2% nationally. The employment status of those at least 15 was that 4,659 (56.6%) people were employed full-time, 1,164 (14.1%) were part-time, and 354 (4.3%) were unemployed.

Administration

Beach Haven forms part of the North Shore ward and Kaipatiki Local Board under the Auckland Council. Prior to 2010, the area had been administered as part of the Birkenhead Borough Council and then as part of North Shore City Council.

Under the voting district for elections to the Parliament of New Zealand it forms part of the Northcote electorate.

Facilities, services and amenities

Beach Haven has one main shopping area with a variety of shops, including a French cafe, two bakeries, a post office, a gym and a police community constable office. There are several preschools and one primary school that serve the area. Churches in the area include the Anglican, Catholic, Orthodox, Mormon and Assembly Of God.

Beach Haven is surrounded by many beaches which are suitable for swimming, including Charcoal Bay which is considered one of the most beautiful bays in the Waitematā Harbour.  The area also has a wharf which is a very popular feature of Beach Haven. The biggest park in Beach Haven is Shepherd's Park which has a 1.6 km walk through native bush beside Oruamo/Hellyers Creek, as well as squash, bowling and tennis facilities. It also has rugby and soccer grounds and is home to Birkenhead United AFC. 
 
Beach Haven is well serviced by bus connections to Takapuna and the CBD. In August 2012 after years of delays, Auckland Transport announced that it would spend NZ$1.35m to upgrade the wharf at Beach Haven, allowing a ferry service to the city to begin at the start of 2013 to coincide with a new service to Hobsonville. It was expected that this new service will ease traffic congestion on Onewa Road and service the wider areas of Glenfield and Birkdale. The ferry service opened with five sailings a day in February 2013. Beach Haven and Hobsonville wharves are the first new ferry services to be built in Auckland in 50 years.

Culture & community

Beach Haven is one of the most diverse areas of the North Shore. There is a very strong sense of community which centres on the village shops at the intersection of Beach Haven and Rangatira Roads. The Beach Haven Placemaking Project has established a garden on the site of the former post office. A complete garden project (funded by local council) began construction in April 2015 and was completed by the end of the year.

In 2013, the community learned that the Beach Haven Methodist Church – which sits on a prominent site in the village – was to be demolished by the Lifewise trust to make way for accessible housing units. The church was built by the community in one day in 1939 using donated timber. "We are dismayed at the prospect of losing the old church building which was built in 1939 in one day by the Beach Haven community," said Lisbeth Alley of the Heart of Beach Haven group. The group and the trust have committed to working together to find a way of keeping the church.

Methodist Mission Northern's property development arm, Airedale Property Trust, spent years discussing the church's future with the community. Bruce Stone, chief executive, said APT was approached by the church to put the land to better use for the community. "There is a shortage of purpose-built housing for people with disabilities," Stone said. "This [development] allows the church to use land in a new way. If [the church] could have been retained on site and used as a part of development, it would have been."

Parts of the area are poorer than other North Shore suburbs, leaving it with something of an unfair reputation. In recent years, there has been a concerted community effort to improve both the reality and the reputation of the area. In 2013, the Kaipatiki Community Policing Project won a national award.

The hip hop artist Sir T. grew up in Beach Haven and often raps about the area. His single "Invincible" was filmed around Lysander Crescent. Another local music legend is Jazz artist Nathan Haines.

Gentrification

Beach Haven is growing in popularity, driven by young professional families because of its new ferry service, access to the water, friendly community and laid-back lifestyle. Prices increased by an average of 44 per cent between 2011 and 2014, though the suburb is still considered to be underpriced compared to its neighbours.

In October 2012, Metro magazine reported Beach Haven had shown one of the biggest increases in property prices in the city over the previous 10 years (admittedly off a lower base than other areas) and named it "One to watch". The magazine was particularly enthusiastic about Island Bay Road.  In 2014, Metro named Beach Haven one of Auckland's hottest suburbs, noting: "A new ferry service, a meandering coastline offering all sorts of delights and a growing sense of community make Beach Haven one of the new hot spots. Still pretty cheap, but we doubt it will stay that way." Houses near the water are especially desirable, with the area around Beach Haven Wharf increasingly referred to as "Beach Haven Point". In September 2015, The New Zealand Herald reported that Beach Haven was one of the city's "20 hottest suburbs" with a 31.5% rise in median price between February–July 2014 and February–July 2015.

Houses are a mix of original character baches, 1950s and 1960s bungalows, apartments as well as architecturally designed homes near the water. Many houses have waterfront access and jetties.

Education
Rolls are as of  Both schools pride themselves on their multi-cultural make-up.

The local college is Birkenhead College, situated between Beach Haven and Birkdale.

References

External links
 Beach Haven Birkdale Residents Association Inc - Official website of the Beach Haven Birkdale Residents Association
 - Beach Haven&d=nsnw-NNI-AAA-7145 - article about beach haven gang violence
 Birkenhead Northcote Glenfield Community Facilities Trust webpage.
 Beach Haven Placemaking Group website
Photographs of Beach Haven held in Auckland Libraries' heritage collections.

Suburbs of Auckland
North Shore, New Zealand
Populated places established in 1922
Populated places around the Waitematā Harbour
Kaipātiki Local Board Area